Team Fintastic are a junior-level synchronized skating team from Helsinki, Finland, representing the figure skating club Helsingin Taitoluisteluklubi (HTK). They are one of the most successful junior teams in the world. Team Fintastic are the 2020 World Junior Champions, three-time world silver medalists (2013, 2015 and 2017) and have eight victories at the Junior World Challenge Cup, with seven consecutive victories from 2007 to 2014.

Competitive results (2000–10)

Competitive results (2010–14)

References

Junior synchronized skating teams
Sports teams in Finland
Figure skating in Finland
Sports clubs in Helsinki
World Junior Synchronized Skating Championships medalists